Lawrence Cook (May 7, 1930 – December 27, 2003) was an American actor.

Cook starred in The Spook Who Sat by the Door (1973). In that film, which was based on the 1969 novel of the same name by Sam Greenlee, Cook portrayed Dan Freeman, a secret black nationalist who is trained by the CIA and later trains and leads black freedom fighters in an uprising against the U.S. government.

Before The Spook Who Sat by the Door, Cook appeared in films such as Cotton Comes to Harlem (1970) and Trouble Man (1972). After Spook, he appeared in  Colors (1988) and Posse (1993), as well as in television series including Family Matters, The Mod Squad, Columbo and McMillan & Wife.
He also appeared as Paul Grant on the daytime soap opera Days Of Our Lives from 1975 to 1976.

Cook died in 2003 in Marina del Rey, California. He was buried in Westwood Village Memorial Park Cemetery.

Filmography

References

External links

1930 births
2003 deaths
Male actors from New York City
African-American male actors
American male film actors
American male television actors
Burials at Westwood Village Memorial Park Cemetery
20th-century American male actors
20th-century African-American people
21st-century African-American people